Cupid is an inner satellite of Uranus. It was discovered by Mark R. Showalter and Jack J. Lissauer in 2003 using the Hubble Space Telescope. It was named after a character in William Shakespeare's play Timon of Athens.

It is the smallest known inner Uranian satellite, crudely estimated to be only about 18 km in diameter. This and the dark surface made it too dim to be detected by the Voyager 2 cameras during its Uranus flyby in 1986.

The orbit of Cupid differs only by 863 km from the orbit of the larger moon Belinda. Unlike Mab and Perdita, Uranian satellites also discovered in 2003, it does not seem to be perturbed. Despite this, it has the least stable orbit of Uranus's inner moons — it is likely to collide with Belinda in the next 100,000–10 million years, due to resonance interactions that cause the smaller Cupid to drift into a more dangerous orbit over this timescale.

Following its discovery, Cupid was given the temporary designation S/2003 U 2. It is also designated Uranus XXVII.

It should not be confused with the asteroid 763 Cupido.

References

External links 
 Hubble Uncovers Smallest Moons Yet Seen Around Uranus – Hubble Space Telescope news release (25 September 2003)

Moons of Uranus
20030825
Moons with a prograde orbit